The Severn River is a river in central Ontario, Canada. Its headwaters are located at the north end of Lake Couchiching. It drains Lake Couchiching and Lake Simcoe. The river flows generally northwest into Georgian Bay, a large bay of Lake Huron.

The Severn forms part of the inland canal system known as the Trent–Severn Waterway, which links Port Severn on Georgian Bay with Trenton on Lake Ontario via the Trent Canal. From the middle of the 19th century up until the completion of the canal in 1920, the Severn was used to transport logs to sawmills down river. There are two hydroelectric stations at falls located on its course.

The river services seasonal cottagers, as many of the properties are accessible only by boat. Some year-round residents live on the Severn. The river sees many yachts/cruisers travelling from Lake Couchiching to Georgian Bay, or vice versa.

Located on the Severn River, Big Chute Marine Railway is a rare operating marine-railway. The Elbląg Canal in Poland is similar.
The Big Chute is a major tourist attraction, and provides access to and from Gloucester Pool, below the Severn. The River sees many overnight campers, although overnight camping is forbidden on many sections of the Severn, including Lost Channel (location of the old fire tower) and Pretty Channel. This law is enforced by police supervision.

According to "Governor Simcoe's Visit in 1793," which can be found in the 1891 volume of the Transactions of the Canadian Institute, the river at that time was known as the River Matchetache.

References

See also 
List of Ontario rivers

Rivers of Muskoka District
Tributaries of Georgian Bay
Trent–Severn Waterway
Lake Simcoe